Lebe lauter (English: Live Louder) is the third studio album by Austrian recording artist Christina Stürmer. It was released by Polydor Records on 15 September 2006 in German-speaking Europe. After the success of her international debut Schwarz Weiss (2005), Stürmer collaborated with producer Thorsten Brötzmann on most songs. Another major success, it became her third album to debut on top of the Austrian Albums Chart and her first to do so in Germany. Lebe lauter was eventually certified 2× Platinum in Austria, and Gold in Switzerland. The songs "Nie genug", "Um bei dir zu sein", and "Ohne Dich" from this album were released as singles.

Track listing

Charts

Weekly charts

Year-end charts

Certifications

References

External links 
 

Christina Stürmer albums
2006 albums
Polydor Records albums
German-language albums